The Battle of Garmsir (also Garmser) was a battle between U.S. Marines and other ISAF coalition forces, and Taliban insurgents in Garmsir, southern Afghanistan. It was part of the ongoing Helmand Province campaign and took place primarily between 2007 and 2011. By the end of December 2007, the situation on the ground had reached a stalemate, and a de facto border had been established. In order to break this stalemate Operation Asada Wosa (Live Free) was undertaken 1st Battalion, 6th Marines, the battalion landing team for the 24th MEU along with elements from 2nd Reconnaissance Bn started their combat operations with an attack on the Taliban-held town of Garmsir on 28 April. The operation was carried out in conjunction with British troops of the 16 Air Assault Brigade. Taliban forces withdrew from the town as a result of the assault and took up a position further south.

After seizing Garmsir, the Marines pushed further south into an area where the insurgents had built bunkers and tunnels capable of withstanding coalition airstrikes. They ran into stiff resistance and the operation, expected to take a few days, lasted more than a month. This implied to the ISAF commander that the town was important to the insurgents, as such the Marines were ordered to remain in the area in order to keep the pressure up. With the original mission changed, the Marines transitioned from combat operations to civil operations.

History
By the end of December 2007, the situation on the ground reached a stalemate. A de facto border was established east of Garmsir along the banks of the Helmand River that divided British-held from Taliban-held territory. The British were outnumbered by the larger Taliban force which was receiving reinforcements from Pakistan. However, the British had jets and heavy artillery on their side. Both forces fought in the following months for mere yards of territory.

In early 2008, the 24th Marine Expeditionary Unit, under the command of Col. Peter Petronzio, arrived to reinforce the ISAF's fight. In April 2008, Col. Petronzio sent a battalion of U.S. Marines to Garmsir.

The Battle: Operation Asada Wosa (Live Free)

1st Battalion, 6th Marines, the battalion landing team for the 24th MEU along with elements from 2nd Reconnaissance Bn started their combat operations with an attack on the Taliban-held town of Garmsir on 28 April. The operation was carried out in conjunction with British troops of the 16 Air Assault Brigade. Taliban forces withdrew from the town as a result of the assault and took up a position further south.

After seizing Garmsir, the Marines pushed further south into an area where the insurgents had built bunkers and tunnels capable of withstanding coalition airstrikes. They ran into stiff resistance and the operation, expected to take a few days, lasted more than a month to complete. This alerted the ISAF commander that the town was important to the insurgents, so he ordered the Marines to remain in the area, rather than clear the town and leave. He was also concerned that the Taliban would emerge after the Marines left, falsely claiming that they had run ISAF forces off. With the original mission changed, the Marines transitioned from combat operations to civil operations. The 24th MEU commander Colonel Peter Petronzio focused on protecting the local Afghans as they began to return to their homes after having been displaced by the Taliban. The Marines also continued their combat operations in the area, killing more than 400 insurgents between April and July 2008, according to governor Gulab Mangal.

Aftermath

On 8 September 2008, the 24th MEU returned control of Garmsir to British forces, after having operated in the area for approximately 130 days. The town was deemed safe and more stable.

Operation Khanjar

On 18 June 2009, Marines from 2nd Battalion, 8th Marines (2/8), as part of the northern push of Operation Khanjar, entered Garmsir Province.

By 5 July, elements of 2/8 were engaged in heavy fighting at Toshtay, 16 miles south of Garmsir. After protracted fighting, the Marines overcame much of the Taliban resistance and began to set up additional patrol bases in Garmsir as part of the Clear-Hold-Build strategy designed to drive the Taliban south and continue Marine territorial gains.

Operation Roadhouse

In April 2010, Marines from 3rd Battalion, 1st Marines (3/1) deployed to Garmsir District, commanded by Lieutenant Colonel Benjamin Watson.

During their deployment, they established several new patrol bases in the southernmost parts of Garmsir, as well as fought building by building in intense fighting to clear the heavily fortified and IED filled Taliban stronghold of Safaar Bazaar. The capture of Safaar was a major defeat for the Taliban in the district.

Operation Godfather
On 14 January 2011 Marines from 2nd Battalion, 1st Marines and Afghan National Army soldiers began clearing Durzay, one of the last remaining Taliban strongholds in the Garmsir District. Marines also crossed over to the western banks of the Helmand River and established positions to deny the Taliban the freedom of movement that had previously allowed them to continue transporting weapons and supplies from Pakistan despite the increased Marine presence in Garmsir. Marines encountered less resistance than expected and Operation Godfather marked the end of major fighting in the Battle for Garmsir, although the Taliban continued to fight after the Operation's conclusion using guerrilla tactics and IED emplacement.

See also
Helmand Province campaign – ISAF campaign in Helmand Province

References

Battles of the War in Afghanistan (2001–2021)
Battles of the War in Afghanistan (2001–2021) involving Estonia
Battles of the War in Afghanistan (2001–2021) involving the United Kingdom
Battles of the War in Afghanistan (2001–2021) involving the United States
United States Marine Corps in the War in Afghanistan (2001–2021)
History of Kandahar Province